Karel Uyttersprot (born 10 July 1949) is a Belgian politician and is affiliated to the N-VA. He was elected as a member of the Belgian Chamber of Representatives in 2010.

Notes

Living people
Members of the Chamber of Representatives (Belgium)
New Flemish Alliance politicians
1949 births
21st-century Belgian politicians
People from Lebbeke